Martha Winch (born 31 October 1978) is an Australian former cricketer.

Winch played domestic cricket for the New South Wales Breakers between 1997 and 2007. She was a member of the Breakers team that won five consecutive Women's National Cricket League titles between 2005/06 and 2009/10, beginning with the 2005/06 finals series against the Queensland Fire.

Winch played seven One Day Internationals for the Australia national women's cricket team.

References

External links
 Martha Winch at southernstars.org.au

Living people
1978 births
Australia women One Day International cricketers